Marriage in Ireland can refer to
Marriage in Northern Ireland
Marriage in the Republic of Ireland